Trifolium longipes is a species of clover known by the common name longstalk clover. It is native to the western United States, where it occurs in many types of habitats such as meadows, valleys, lower mountains, and subalpine slopes. There are many subtaxa (subspecies and varieties) which occur in different regions and differ slightly in appearance. In general, it is a perennial herb with leaves made up of 2 to 5 leaflets which are variable in shape. The inflorescence is a head of flowers up to 3 centimeters wide with white to purplish or bicolored corollas.

References

External links
 Calflora Database: Trifolium longipes
Jepson Manual eFlora (TJM2) treatment of Trifolium longipes
Washington Burke Museum
UC CalPhotos gallery: Trifolium longipes

longipes
Flora of the Northwestern United States
Flora of the Southwestern United States
Flora of California
Flora of New Mexico
Flora of the Cascade Range
Flora of the Rocky Mountains
Flora of the Sierra Nevada (United States)
Flora without expected TNC conservation status